Shin Jung-Hwan (Hangul : 신정환, born 18 August 1986) is a South Korean football player who plays for Yongin City in the Second Division, Korea National League.

Shin was previously on the books for Jeju United FC and Chunnam Dragons in the K-League.

References

External links 

1986 births
Living people
Association football goalkeepers
South Korean footballers
Jeju United FC players
Korean Police FC (Semi-professional) players
Jeonnam Dragons players
Ulsan Hyundai Mipo Dockyard FC players
K League 1 players
Korea National League players